Stigmella gustafssoni is a moth of the family Nepticulidae. It was described by Capuse in 1975. It is found in Zambia.

References

Nepticulidae
Moths of Africa
Moths described in 1975